Bogle Corner is an unincorporated community in Lewis Township, Clay County, Indiana. It is part of the Terre Haute Metropolitan Statistical Area.

History
The Bogle family lent the community its name.

Geography

References

Unincorporated communities in Clay County, Indiana
Unincorporated communities in Indiana
Terre Haute metropolitan area